Jacques Tarride (10 March 1903 – 5 October 1994) was a French actor.

Biography 
He was born in the 8th arrondissement of Paris and died in La Loupe, Eure-et-Loir. He was the son of the actor Abel Tarride and the brother of the director Jean Tarride.

Partial filmography 

 Amour... amour... (1932) - Bob
 A Gentleman of the Ring (1932) - Le marquis
 The Man with a Broken Ear (1934) - Léon Renaud
 Notre-Dame d'amour (1936)
 Je chante (1938) - Le patron du café (uncredited)
 Immediate Call (1939) - Le secrétaire
 Sacred Woods (1939)
 Cristobal's Gold (1940) - Le médecin
 Strange Suzy (1941)
 The Murderer is Afraid at Night (1942) - Joseph
 Promesse à l'inconnue (1942) - Le bijoutier
 Feu sacré (1942)
 La croisée des chemins (1942) - Julien
 A Woman in the Night (1943) - Un comédien
 Départ à zéro (1943) - Malicart
 Le mort ne reçoit plus (1944) - Le juge Armandy
 Manon, a 326 (1945)
 La troisième dalle (1946) - Le valet de chambre
 Captain Blomet (1947)
 Si jeunesse savait... (1948) - Le professeur
 The Cupboard Was Bare (1948) - Le commissaire-priseur
 Fantômas contre Fantômas (1949) - Le poète
 Tous les deux (1949) - Le vétérinaire
 La veuve et l'innocent (1949) - Charles
 At the Grand Balcony (1949) - Macherel
 Three Telegrams (1950) - M. Grandjean
 Lost Souvenirs (1950) - Le scrétaire
 Under the Sky of Paris (1951) - Un journaliste (uncredited)
 Clara de Montargis (1951)
 Les deux Monsieur de Madame (1951) - L'assistant
 Nana (1955) - Mignom
 Folies Bergère (1956) - Adjoint du maire (final film role)

External links 

1903 births
1994 deaths
French male film actors
Male actors from Paris
20th-century French male actors